is a Prefectural Natural Park in southwest Aomori Prefecture, Japan. Established in 1958, the park lies wholly within the municipality of Hirosaki.

See also
 National Parks of Japan

References

Parks and gardens in Aomori Prefecture
Hirosaki
Protected areas established in 1958
1958 establishments in Japan